Quebrada Grande is a district of the Tilarán canton, in the Guanacaste province of Costa Rica.

Toponymy

History 
On 11 June 2020, the Cabeceras district was segregated from Quebrada Grande, by allocating  from the originally  of Quebrada Grande.

Geography 
Quebrada Grande has an area of  km² and an elevation of  metres.

Locations 
Poblados: Barrionuevo, Cabeceras de Cañas, Campos de Oro, Dos de Tilarán, Esperanza, Florida, Monte Olivos, Nubes, San Miguel, Turín (part), Vueltas

Demographics 

For the 2011 census, Quebrada Grande had a population of  inhabitants.

Transportation

Road transportation 
The district is covered by the following road routes:
 National Route 145
 National Route 606
 National Route 619

References 

Districts of Guanacaste Province
Populated places in Guanacaste Province